Norbert Reiland (born 20 March 1944) is a retired Luxembourgian football midfielder.

References

1944 births
Living people
Luxembourgian footballers
CS Fola Esch players
Jeunesse Esch players
Association football midfielders
Luxembourg international footballers